The leiqin (雷琴 or 擂琴, literally "thunderous instrument"; also called leihu) is a Chinese bowed string musical instrument.

Construction
It has a metal soundbox covered with snakeskin and a long fretless fingerboard. The two strings pass over a small bridge that is placed on the snakeskin, near the top edge.

Playing technique
The leiqin is played while the player is seated in a chair, with the instrument's body resting in his or her lap and held in a vertical or near-vertical position. Unlike the erhu and other instruments in the huqin family, the strings are touched against the fingerboard in the same technique as the sanxian.

History
The leiqin was adapted from an earlier traditional instrument called zhuihu in the 1920s.

See also
Zhuihu
Huqin
Music of China
Traditional Chinese musical instruments
String instruments

External links
Leihu page
Leiqin photo

Audio
Leiqin MP3s (click on headphones to listen to individual tracks)

Video
Leiqin video

Bowed string instruments
Chinese musical instruments
Drumhead lutes